Suleima is a genus of moths belonging to the subfamily Olethreutinae of the family Tortricidae.

Species
Suleima baracana (Kearfott, 1907)
Suleima cinerodorsana Heinrich, 1923
Suleima daracana (Kearfott, 1907)
Suleima helianthana (Riley, 1881)
Suleima lagopana (Walsingham, 1879)
Suleima mendaciana Blanchard & Knudson, 1983
Suleima skinnerana Heinrich, 1923

See also
List of Tortricidae genera

References

External links
tortricidae.com

Eucosmini
Tortricidae genera
Taxa named by Carl Heinrich